The Maratha rulers, belonging to the various dynasties, from the early 17th century to the early 18th century, built and ruled the Maratha Empire on the Indian subcontinent. It was established by the Chhatrapati (the Maratha emperor) in 1670s. Starting in 1720s, the Peshwa were instrumental in expanding the Maratha Empire to cover large areas of the Indian subcontinent. At their empire's greatest extent in the late 17th and early 18th centuries, they controlled much of the Indian subcontinent. Peshwas served as subordinates to the Chhatrapati, but later, they became the leaders of the Marathas, and the Chhatrapati was reduced to a nominal ruler. Their power rapidly dwindled during the 19th century and later Peshwas also were reduced to nominal ruler under various Maratha nobles and later British East India Company. The last Peshwa was deposed in 1818. The Satara Chhatrapati continued to nominally rule over Satara state till 1848 and Kolhapur Chhatrapati continued to nominally rule over Kolhapur state till 1947.

Chhatrapatis

Chhatrapati Shivaji Maharaj and his early descendants 
This is the list of the initial Chhatrapatis.

Chhatrapatis of Satara 
This is the list of the Chhatrapatis of Satara.

Chhatrapatis of Kolhapur 
This is the list of the Chhatrapatis of Kolhapur.

Peshwas

Early Peshwas

Peshwas (Bhat family)

Other

Gaekwad of Baroda

Holkar of Indore

Shinde of Gwalior

Bhonsle of Nagpur

References

Notes

External links 

History of India
Maratha Empire